Donato Paduano (born 28 November 1948) is a Canadian former boxer. He competed in the men's welterweight event at the 1968 Summer Olympics.

References

External links
 

1948 births
Living people
Canadian male boxers
Olympic boxers of Canada
Boxers at the 1968 Summer Olympics
Boxers at the 1967 Pan American Games
Pan American Games bronze medalists for Canada
Pan American Games medalists in boxing
People from Campobasso
Italian emigrants to Canada
Welterweight boxers
Medalists at the 1967 Pan American Games
Sportspeople from the Province of Campobasso